Jack Colreavy (born 15 June 1989) is an Australian long-distance runner. He competed in the men's marathon at the 2017 World Championships in Athletics.

References

External links
 

1989 births
Living people
Australian male long-distance runners
Australian male marathon runners
World Athletics Championships athletes for Australia
Place of birth missing (living people)